AVCATT (Aviation Combined Arms Tactical Trainer) is a mobile aviation training simulator developed by L-3 Communications, Link Simulation & Training for the United States Army in 2001. Entire units (suites) have been fielded. 

AVCATT is used by Active, Reserve and Army National Guard components. AVCATT supports unit collective and combined arms training for the AH-64, UH-60, CH-47 and OH-58 aircraft. Other AVCATT modules, such as the Non-Rated Crewmember Manned Module ((NCM3), a sub-system of AVCATT), can be linked to this base configuration to support specific unit training requirements. The NCM3 supports the training of non-rated crew members in crew coordination, flight, aerial gunnery, hoist and sling load-related tasks.

AVCATT is a mobile, transportable, multi-station device that supports unit collective and combined arms training for helicopter aircrews. The AVCATT occupies two trailers with the NCM3 adding a third trailer containing two reconfigurable modules for the CH-47 and UH-60. Both the AVCATT and NCM3 use helmet-mounted displays (HMD).

Management
The Army Aviation Center (Fort Rucker) is a proponent.

TRADOC Capability Manager - Virtual & Gaming (Fort Leavenworth) is the Capability Manager. PEO STRI PdM Maneuver Collective Training System, part of PM Integrated Training Environment is the Material Developer.

Cole Engineering Services, Inc, provides Post Deployment Software Support.

AVT Simulation provides concurrency upgrades as part of the AVCATT Reconnaissance Attack Contract.

It is interoperable with CCTT and VCCT.

Terrain data bases 

Fort Irwin National Training Center
Grafenwoehr-Hohenfels
Iraq
Fort Hood
Afghanistan
Korea
Fort Bliss
Fort Campbell
Fort Drum
Joint Base Lewis McChord
Fort Stewart
Fort Bragg
Fort Benning
Hawaii

References 
 PEO STRI Website for Aviation Combined Arms Tactical Trainer (AVCATT)

External links
 L-3 Communications website for AVCATT
 MPEG-video of the AVCATT collective training system
 Older MPEG-video demonstrating AVCATT's capabilities
 Cole Engineering Services Inc
 AVT Simulation

Military electronics of the United States
L3Harris Technologies
Military equipment introduced in the 2000s